Damiano Mazza  is an Italian rugby union player.
His usual position is as a centre and he currently plays for Zebre Parma in United Rugby Championship. 

He was born in Montecchio Emilia, on 16 February 1999. Mazza signed for Zebre in May 2022 ahead of the 2022–23 United Rugby Championship.

In 2018 and 2019 Mazza was a part of the Italy Under 20 squad. 
On 10 January 2023, he was named in Italy A squad for a uncapped test against Romania A.

References

External links
It's Rugby England Profile
Eurosport Profile
All Rugby Profile

1999 births
Italian rugby union players
Living people
Sportspeople from Reggio Emilia
Rugby union centres
Rugby Calvisano players
Zebre Parma players